Charles Francis Buller (26 May 1846 – 22 November 1906) was a cricketer who was born in Colombo, Ceylon, but played his cricket for Middlesex and the Marylebone Cricket Club. An alumnus of Harrow School whose father William also played first-class cricket for the MCC, Buller was a right-handed batsman and occasional right-handed round arm bowler. Over his career from 1864 to 1877 he scored 3,140 runs at a batting average of 21.80, with two centuries.

References

External links

1846 births
1906 deaths
People educated at Harrow School
Cricketers from Colombo
Middlesex cricketers
Marylebone Cricket Club cricketers
English cricketers
North v South cricketers
Southgate cricketers
Gentlemen of the South cricketers
Gentlemen cricketers
Gentlemen of England cricketers
North of the Thames v South of the Thames cricketers
I Zingari cricketers
Left-Handed v Right-Handed cricketers
English people of Sri Lankan descent
Charles, 1846
Gentlemen of Middlesex cricketers
W. G. Grace's XI cricketers
Gentlemen of Marylebone Cricket Club cricketers
R. D. Walker's XI cricketers
English male tennis players